Trapos íntimos (English title:Designs of Love) is a Venezuelan telenovela written by Valentina Párraga and produced by Radio Caracas Television in 2002.

Marlene De Andrade, Carlos Montilla, Gabriela Vergara and Alfonso Medina starred as the protagonists with  Dad Dáger as the antagonist.

In 2011, Televisa produced a remake of Trapos íntimos titled Amorcito corazón.

Plot
Fernando Lobo is a young widower with a strong character who thinks that no one can replace his late wife Soledad Andueza. As a father of three daughters, he decides to move to Caracas. On the other hand, Isabel Cordero is a beautiful and willful interior designer, who works as an art teacher. On the eve of sleeping with her boyfriend for the first time, fear grips her, and the experience becomes a disaster that marks her life. Fernando begins a new life as General Manager of a well-known brand "Caricia",

unsociable and strong character, who thinks that no one can replace his late wife, . Father of three daughters, Fernando decides to move to Caracas . For her part,  He has a boyfriend, but on the eve of sleeping with him for the first time, fear grips her and experience becomes a disaster that will leave her marked for life.

After closing his cycle as oil manager, Fernando begins a new life as General Manager of the well-known brand "Caricia", an underwear factory owned by his mother-in-law, the autocratic Federica de Andueza. Fernando hates changing from working in the oil industry to working in the feminine world.

Cast

Marlene De Andrade as Isabel Cecilia Cordero
Carlos Montilla as Fernando Lobo Santacruz
Gabriela Vergara as Lucía Lobo Santacruz
Alfonso Medina as William Guillermo Pinzón "Willy"
Dad Dáger as Manuela Federica Andueza / Soledad Andueza de Lobo
Flavia Gleske as Zoe Guerrero
Amanda Gutiérrez as Federica Ruíz Vda. de Andueza
Alicia Plaza as Beba Solís
Leonardo Marrero as Jorge Luis Solís
Iván Tamayo as Felipe Ferrer
Saúl Marín as Cecilio Monsalve
Juan Carlos Gardié as Elmer Rosas Rojas
Nacarid Escalona as Doris Day Montiel
Rosario Prieto as Eulalia Pinzón
Francis Rueda as Carmen Teresa Cordero
Carlos Guillermo Haydon as Mauricio Rossi
Eduardo Orozco as Juan "Juancho" Febres
Marisa Román as María Soledad "Marisol" Lobo Andueza
Yelena Maciel as María de Lourdes "Mariló" Lobo Andueza
Maria Gabriela de Faría as María Fernanda "Marifer" Lobo Andueza
Gabriel López as Gabriel Pérez "Tuqueque"
Ivette Domínguez as Guillermina Azuaje
Alejandro Mata as Gumersindo Cordero
Araceli Prieto as Sor Ernestina González
Émerson Rondón as Ramón "Moncho" Pérez
Gerardo Soto as Nicolás "Nico" Santacruz
Jesús Cervó as Pancho Ruíz
Lady Dayana Núñez as Bárbara Eulalia "Barbarita" Pinzón
Noel Carmona as Álvaro Mejías Parissi
Crisol Carabal as Ángela ChacónYugui López as El GoajiroNacho Huett as Ricardo "Ricky" PinzónJosé Luis Zuleta as Inspector IdrogoAura Rivas as Elia Morón Figuera''

References

External links

2002 telenovelas
2002 Venezuelan television series debuts
2003 Venezuelan television series endings
RCTV telenovelas
Venezuelan telenovelas
Spanish-language telenovelas
Television shows set in Caracas